Chaoyangmen Subdistrict is a subdistrict in eastern portion of Dongcheng District, Beijing, China. It consists of 9 communities. As of 2020, this subdistrict has a population of 30,473.

The subdistrict was named after Chaoyangmen, a gate part of Beijing's city wall that once stood in the region.

History

Administrative Division 
As of 2021, Chaoyangmen Subdistrict was divided into 9 communities, they are as follows:

Famous Sites 

 Chaoyangmen
 Dongsi Mosque

See also
List of township-level divisions of Beijing

References

Dongcheng District, Beijing
Subdistricts of Beijing